Robert Jean Wollek  (4 November 1943 – 16 March 2001), nicknamed "Brilliant Bob", was a race car driver from Strasbourg, France. He won a total of 76 races in his career, 71 in Porsche cars, including four editions of the 24 Hours of Daytona and one edition of the 12 Hours of Sebring. He died in a road accident in Florida while riding a bicycle back to his accommodation after the day's practice sessions for the following day's race, the 12 Hours of Sebring.

Skiing career

Prior to his racing days as a university student, Wollek was also a member of the French National Skiing Team between 1966 and 1968 competing in the Winter Universiade, he won three gold and two silver medals altogether (see table on the right)

His skiing career came to an end when he was injured during preparations for the Winter Olympics.

Early racing career
Prior to a skiing accident which ended his skiing career, Wollek began racing cars when he entered the Mont-Blanc Rally in 1967 driving a Renault 8 Gordini and won. The following year, when his skiing career ended, he started his racing career when he entered a Volant Shell scholarship race taking place at the Le Mans' Bugatti Circuit, finishing runner-up to François Migault. Wollek later entered the Alpine Trophy Le Mans which he won, earning himself a place for the 1968 24 Hours of Le Mans where he finished 11th overall and 2nd in class on his debut driving an Alpine A210.

In 1969, Wollek made his debut in single seater racing competing in Formula France before graduating to the French Formula Three Championship.

During a round at Rouen-Les-Essarts, Wollek was involved in a fatal accident which killed Jean-Luc Salomon, when the pair plus Jean-Pierre Jaussaud, Richard Scott and Mike Beuttler were all fighting for the lead at Scierie, where the track is a two-lane road.

In 1971, Wollek switched to Formula Two driving for Ron Dennis's Rondel Racing. Despite a shaky start with only one point that year, he improved his performance for the following year with a single win at Imola and 21 points, placing him seventh. Despite this success, he abandoned his Formula One ambition to concentrate on sportscar racing where he would become one of the most recognizable names in the sport.

Sportscar racing

During his three decades of sports car racing, almost exclusively in Porsches, he won the 24 Hours of Daytona four times (1983, 1985, 1989, 1991) and the DRM in 1982 and 1983, with the Porsche 936 and Porsche 956 entered by the Joest Racing team.  In the mid-1970s, he raced a Porsche 935K2 improved and entered by the Kremer Racing team from Cologne.

For many years, Monsieur Porsche challenged the factory team with privately entered cars, but was also hired to become part of the official Porsche Le Mans team in 1978, 1979, 1986, 1987, 1988, 1996, 1997, and 1998. In 1981, he even raced a Group C-spec Kremer-built Porsche 917, about a decade after these cars were retired initially.

Wollek never won the 24 Hours of Le Mans overall, despite coming close in a few of his thirty attempts. In 1997, his leading factory-entered Porsche 911 GT1 suffered damage in a minor incident, so the car had to be retired. In 1998, Porsche scored a 1–2 win, but Bob was once again on the less-lucky runner-up car.

After the 1998 season, Porsche retired its GT1 cars from the Mercedes-dominated FIA GT Championship, providing only Porsche 911 based cars for the lower GT classes. In 2000, Wollek scored many class wins in the American Le Mans Series (ALMS) in a Porsche 996 GT3.  The last race Wollek entered was the 2001 12 Hours of Sebring in a Porsche 996 GT3-RS.  Wollek had already won there in 1985 with A. J. Foyt, driving a Porsche 962. Despite being over 50 years of age and still racing competitively, Wollek had developed a fitness regime of riding bicycles to stay in good physical condition, especially for the longer races such as the 24 Hours of Le Mans, to which he rode from home across France.

Typical of many other racing drivers, Bob ran a car dealership for Jaguar.

Death
On Friday 16 March 2001, while leaving Sebring International Raceway following practice for the 12 Hours of Sebring, Wollek continued a tradition of cycling between the circuit and his accommodation, which took him west on Highway 98.  While he had been riding close to the edge of the pavement, he was struck from behind by a van driven by an elderly driver from Okeechobee, Florida at approximately 4:30 p.m.  He was transported to Highlands Regional Medical Center in Sebring and was pronounced dead on arrival. Wollek was due to start in the Petersen Motorsports Porsche 996 GT3-RS with Johnny Mowlem and Michael Petersen, however out of respect the car was withdrawn from the race. On race day, the organizers held a one-minute silence in memory of Wollek. Prior to his death, he announced he would retire from racing to serve as an ambassador for Porsche, and was due to sign this agreement upon returning home after Sebring.

Racing record

Complete 24 Hours of Le Mans results

References

External links
 
 
 
 

1943 births
2001 deaths
French racing drivers
International Race of Champions drivers
European Formula Two Championship drivers
Cycling road incident deaths
French male alpine skiers
Sportspeople from Strasbourg
24 Hours of Le Mans drivers
24 Hours of Daytona drivers
American Le Mans Series drivers
World Sportscar Championship drivers
Road incident deaths in Florida
12 Hours of Sebring drivers
Universiade gold medalists for France
Universiade silver medalists for France
Universiade medalists in alpine skiing
Competitors at the 1966 Winter Universiade
Competitors at the 1968 Winter Universiade
Porsche Motorsports drivers
Team Joest drivers
Jaguar Racing drivers
Larbre Compétition drivers
FIA GT Championship drivers